Lithuania competed at the 2018 European Athletics Championships in Berlin, Germany, from 6–12 August 2018. A delegation of 27 athletes were sent to represent the country.

Medalists

Results

The following athletes have been selected to compete by the Lithuanian Athletics Association.

 Men 
 Track and road

Field events

Women
 Track and road

Field events

References

Nations at the 2018 European Athletics Championships
Lithuania at the European Athletics Championships
European Athletics Championships